Maurolycus is one of the more prominent lunar impact craters in the southern highland region of the Moon that is covered in overlapping crater impacts. It was named after 16th century Italian mathematician Francesco Maurolico. It is joined at the southeast rim by the smaller crater Barocius. Due west lie the overlapping pair of Stöfler and Faraday. To the northeast is the faint crater Buch, and further to the north lies Gemma Frisius.

The outer walls of Maurolycus are tall, wide, and terraced, most notably in the eastern part. To the southeast the rim is lower and the crater is joined to what has the appearance of an overlain crater rim. The crater Maurolycus F lies across the northwest rim, and that part of the crater floor is more rugged than the remainder. The other sections of the floor are relatively level, with a complex of central peaks and a pair of craterlets. The small crater Maurolycus A is biting into the southern part of the rim.

Satellite craters

By convention these features are identified on lunar maps by placing the letter on the side of the crater midpoint that is closest to Maurolycus.

References

External links

 

Impact craters on the Moon